Gerasimos Fylaktou  (born 24 July 1991) is a Cypriot footballer who plays as a central midfielder for Pafos.

Club career 
Fylaktou started his playing career from Digenis Morphou. In the summer of 2012 he transferred to Alki Larnaca to play for the first time in the Cypriot First Division. On 4 July 2014 he signed a contract with Omonia making the big step in his career. On 24 July 2017 he was given on loan to Pafos.

Career statistics

Club

References

External links 
 UEFA profile
 
 

1991 births
Sportspeople from Nicosia
Living people
Cypriot footballers
Association football midfielders
Cyprus under-21 international footballers
Cyprus youth international footballers
Cyprus international footballers
Cypriot First Division players
Cypriot Second Division players
Digenis Akritas Morphou FC players
Alki Larnaca FC players
AC Omonia players
Pafos FC players
Ermis Aradippou FC players